Lilo Vilaplana is a Cuban director, screenwriter and teacher.

Career 
In 1988, Vilaplana worked as an assistant director in children's series for directors such as Roberto Villar Aleman, Raul Guerra, María Elena Espinosa and Eduardo Macias.

He began his career as a screenwriter and director with the Children's live weekly program "Dando Vueltas" from 1991 to 1997, which is when he moved and settled in Colombia .

In Colombia he worked as creative in Film and TV Cine company and after several jobs are linked to FoxTelecolombia, a company which achieves greater recognition as Director of the series "El Capo".

Colombian Television 

 Short AGRYPNIA of production interdependent 2012 (Concursó en el Festival de Nuevo Cine Latinoamericano de La Habana, Cuba.) - Guionist and Director.

Fox Telecolombia 

 Serie - El Capo 2 - Director. 
 Telenovela - La Traicionera - Director. 
 Serie - La Mariposa (2010/2011) - Director. 
 Serie - Lynch - Director de los capítulos 2 y 6. 
 Serie - Mentes en Shock (2010) - Director de los capítulos: 3, 8 y 9. 
 Telenovela - "Un sueño llamado Salsa" - (2010) - Director. 
 Serie - "El Capo" (90 Capítulos) - Director. (7 premios India Catalina y 7 premios TV y Novelas). 
 Capítulo - "Remedio Mortal" de la serie Tiempo Final 3. (2009) - Director. 
 Telenovela - "La Dama de Troya" (2008) - Director. 
 Capítulo - "La Deuda" para el seriado "Sin Retorno" (2008) - Guionista y Director. 
 Telenovela - "Zona Rosa" (2007) - Director a partir del capítulo 42. 
 Telenovela - "Por Amor" (2006) - Director. 
 Telenovela - "El pasado no perdona" (2005) - Director. 
 Cortometraje - "Se me olvidó decirte" (Co Produce y escribe Héctor Forero de Escritores Asociados - 2004) - Coproductor y Director. 
 Telenovela - "Me Amarás bajo la lluvia" (2004) - Director desde el Cap. 80 hasta el Cap. 240. 
 Serie - "Retratos" 240 Capítulos. (2003) - Director. 
 "Expedientes (2002 – 2003) - Director. 
 "Unidad Investigativa" (2002 – 2003) - Director.
 Serie - "Auto Stop" (2002) - Thespis Producciones para TELECOLOMBIA - Canal UNO - Guionista, Productor y Director. 
 "Justicia o Ley" Unitarios (2002). Thespis producciones para TELECOLOMBIA. Canal UNO. Guionista, Productor y Director de 45 capítulos.

Produce TVCINE:

 "Siguiendo el Rastro" (1997). Guionista y Director.

References

Living people
Cuban directors
Year of birth missing (living people)